Khaled Hosseini (Pashto/Dari  ; born March 4, 1965) is an Afghan-American novelist, UNHCR goodwill ambassador, and former physician. His debut novel The Kite Runner (2003) was a critical and commercial success; the book and his subsequent novels have all been at least partially set in Afghanistan and have featured an Afghan as the protagonist.

Born in Kabul, Afghanistan, to a diplomat father, Hosseini spent some time living in Iran and France. When Hosseini was 15, his family applied for asylum in the United States, where he later became a naturalized citizen. Hosseini did not return to Afghanistan until 2003 when he was 38, an experience similar to that of the protagonist in The Kite Runner. In later interviews, Hosseini admitted to feeling survivor's guilt for having been able to leave the country prior to the Soviet invasion and subsequent wars. 

After graduating from college, Hosseini worked as a physician in California, a situation he likened to "an arranged marriage". The success of The Kite Runner meant he was able to retire from medicine in order to write full-time. His three novels have all reached various levels of critical and commercial success. The Kite Runner spent 101 weeks on The New York Times Best Seller list, including three weeks at number one. His second novel, A Thousand Splendid Suns (2007), spent 103 weeks on the chart, including 15 at number one while his third novel, And the Mountains Echoed (2013), remained on the chart for 33 weeks. In addition to writing, Hosseini has advocated for the support of refugees, including establishing with the UNHCR the Khaled Hosseini Foundation to support Afghan refugees returning to Afghanistan.

Early life and education

Early life
Hosseini was born on March 4, 1965, in Kabul, Afghanistan, the eldest of five children. His father, Nasser, worked as a diplomat for the Ministry of Foreign Affairs in Kabul while his mother worked as a Persian language teacher at a girls' high school; both originate from Herat. Regarding his ethnicity, Hosseini stated, "I'm not pure anything. There's a Pashtun part of me, a Tajik part of me." His mother's family is believed to be from the Mohammadzai tribe of Pashtuns. Hosseini describes his upbringing as privileged. He spent eight years of his childhood in the upper class Wazir Akbar Khan neighborhood in Kabul. Hosseini does not recall his sister, Raya, ever suffering discrimination for being a female, and he remembers Kabul as "a growing, thriving, cosmopolitan city", where he regularly flew kites with his cousins.

In 1970, Hosseini and his family moved to Iran where his father worked for the Embassy of Afghanistan in Tehran. In 1973, Hosseini's family returned to Kabul, and Hosseini's youngest brother was born in July of that year. In 1976, when Hosseini was 11 years old, his father secured a job in Paris, France, and moved the family there. They were unable to return to Afghanistan because of the April 1978 Saur Revolution in which the People's Democratic Party of Afghanistan (PDPA) seized power. In 1980, shortly after the start of the Soviet–Afghan War, they sought political asylum in the United States and made their residence in San Jose, California. Hosseini, then aged 15, did not speak English when he first arrived in the United States. He describes the experience as "a culture shock" and "very alienating".

Despite their distance from the country's turmoil, the family was aware of the situations faced by a number of their friends and relatives. Hosseini explained:

Education
Hosseini graduated from Independence High School in San Jose in 1984 and enrolled at Santa Clara University, where he earned a bachelor's degree in biology in 1988. The following year, he entered the University of California San Diego School of Medicine, where he earned his M.D. in 1993. He completed his residency in internal medicine at Cedars-Sinai Medical Center in Los Angeles in 1997. He practiced medicine for over ten years, until a year and a half after the release of The Kite Runner.

Career

Novels

In 2003, Hosseini published his first novel, The Kite Runner, the story of a young boy, Amir, struggling to form a deeper connection with his father and coping with memories of a traumatic childhood event. The novel is set in Afghanistan, from the fall of the monarchy until the collapse of the Taliban regime, as well as in the San Francisco Bay Area, specifically in Fremont, California. The novel was the best selling novel of 2005 in the United States, according to Nielsen BookScan. The Kite Runner was also produced as an audiobook read by the author. The Kite Runner has been adapted into a film of the same name released in December 2007. Hosseini made a cameo appearance towards the end of the movie as a bystander, when Amir buys a kite which he later flies with Sohrab.

Hosseini's second novel, A Thousand Splendid Suns, was published in 2007, and is also set in Afghanistan. The story addresses many of the same issues as Hosseini's first book, but from a female perspective. It follows the story of two women, Mariam and Laila, whose lives become entwined when Mariam's husband takes on Laila as a second wife. The story is set during Afghanistan's tumultuous thirty-year transition from Soviet occupation to Taliban control and post-Taliban rebuilding. The novel was released by Riverhead Books on May 22, 2007, at the same time as the Simon & Schuster audiobook. The adaptation rights of the novel were subsequently acquired by producer Scott Rudin and Columbia Pictures.

Hosseini's third novel And the Mountains Echoed was released on May 21, 2013. Prior to its release, Hosseini said:

UNHCR
Hosseini is currently a Goodwill Envoy for the United Nations High Commissioner for Refugees (UNHCR). He has been working to provide humanitarian assistance in Afghanistan through the Khaled Hosseini Foundation. The concept for the foundation was inspired by the trip to Afghanistan that Hosseini made in 2007 with UNHCR, with the organisation raising funds to build homes for refugees returning to Afghanistan.

In 2018, Hosseini published an illustrated short story, Sea Prayer, inspired by the death of Alan Kurdi, a three year old refugee who drowned when trying to reach Europe from Syria. Proceeds from sales went to the UNHCR and the Khaled Hosseini Foundation.

Influences
As a child,  Hosseini read a lot of Persian poetry, especially the works of poets such as Rumi, Omar Khayyám, Abdul-Qādir Bēdil, and Hafez. He has also cited a Persian translation of Jack London's White Fang as a key influence from his youth, in addition to translations of novels including Alice in Wonderland and Mickey Spillane's Mike Hammer series. He has cited Afghan singer Ahmad Zahir as a key musical influence, choosing the songs "Madar' and "Aye Padesha Khuban" as his two Inheritance Tracks during an appearance on BBC Radio 4's Saturday Live, and naming Zahir as "the Afghan Elvis" and stating his music was "one of the seminal memories of my time in Afghanistan".

While President Hamid Karzai had signed an agreement to ban bacha bazi, corruption, lawlessness and poverty will allow the business to thrive. Moreover, combating the abuse of poor children is not seen as a priority by the Kabul administration. While Khaled Hosseini’s novel The Kite Runner exposed bacha bazi, greater international pressure is needed to bring the odious practice to an end.

Personal life
Hosseini is married to Roya, and they have two children. The family reside in Northern California. He is fluent in Persian and Pashto, and has described himself as a secular Muslim. In July 2022, Hosseini announced via social media that his 21 year old child had come out as transgender.

Bibliography
 The Kite Runner (2003)
 A Thousand Splendid Suns (2007)
 And the Mountains Echoed (2013)
 Sea Prayer (2018)

Awards and honors
In 2008, Hosseini received the  Golden Plate Award of the American Academy of Achievement.

See also 

 List of best-selling fiction authors

References

External links 

Official website of The Khaled Hosseini Foundation

Khaled Hosseini at Bloomsbury Publishing
"The Kite Runner Author Returns Home, Lev Grossman, Time, May 17, 2007

1965 births
Living people
Afghan emigrants to the United States
Afghan novelists
Physicians from California
American Muslims
Afghan Muslims
American people of Pashtun descent
Afghan Tajik people
Exophonic writers
Santa Clara University alumni
University of California, San Diego alumni
Writers from San Jose, California
Afghan expatriates in France
People from Kabul
21st-century American novelists
American novelists of Asian descent
American male novelists
American writers of Afghan descent
Afghan expatriates in Iran
21st-century American male writers
21st-century Afghan writers
American humanitarians
United Nations High Commissioner for Refugees Goodwill Ambassadors